Los Mismos (English: "The Same Ones"), previously known as Los Bukis, is a Mexican Grupera music band from Ario de Rosales, Michoacán. The band was established in June 1996, after Marco Antonio Solís left the band Los Bukis, the remaining members regrouped as Los Mismos. Under the name Los Mismos, the band has released eleven albums, under five different labels, including EMI Latin, Univision Music Group, Skalona Records, Discos Power Records and Discos America. Not to be confused with the Spanish music band of the same name in the 1970s.

Formation
Los Bukis
In the 1970s, cousins Marco Antonio Solís and Joel Solís began writing and performing music as a duo, known as Los Hermanitos Solis (English: "The Little Solis Brothers"). As their music and following grew, they expanded the band, using the name Los Bukis (English: "Little Kid"). Marco Antonio Solís served as the lead vocalist, while additionally writing and producing all of the band's music. Their first album sold one million records in one year, certifying the album as Diamond status, in accordance with the Asociación Mexicana de Productores de Fonogramas y Videogramas (English: "Mexican Association of Producers of Phonograms and Videograms, A.C.") guidelines. Their first song from the album was "Falso Amor" (English: "False love"). While Los Bukis continued performing and releasing new music, Marco Antonio Solís also wrote and produced albums for Marisela, Rocío Dúrcal, and María Sorté.

Los Mismos
In 1995, after 20 years with Los Bukis, lead singer and songwriter Marco Antonio Solís decided to pursue a solo career,  an agreement was made for neither Solís or the remaining band members to perform using the Purépecha name "buki" (English: "Little Kid") in any form. In accordance with the agreement, the remaining members of Los Bukis regrouped with Pedro Velázquez joining the group as lead vocalist. The members of Los Bukis renamed the band to Los Mismos (English: "The Same Ones"), acknowledging that the new band is the same as Los Bukis, albeit with a different lead singer.

Band members

 Pedro Velázquez – lead vocals (1996 – present)
 Carlos Vazquez – 1st keyboard (2021 – present)
 Gustavo Morales – 2nd keyboard, percussion (2001 – present)
 Isaac Guadarrama – bass guitar (2004 – 2012, 2017 – present)
 Jorge Ortiz – drums (2002–2008, 2021– present)
 Carlos Ivan Salgado – lead guitar  (2018 –  present)

Former Members
 Joel Solis – lead guitar, second vocals (1996 – 1998)
 Roberto Guadarrama – 1st keyboard, trumpet, producer, composer, arranger, Director and second vocals (1996 – 2021)
 Eusebio "El Chivo" Cortez – bass guitar (1996 – 2000, 2003 – 2004, 2012 – 2017)
 Jose "Pepe" Guadarrama – 2nd keyboard, second vocals, percussion and saxophone (1996 – 2001)
 Pedro Sanchez – drums (1996 – 2002, 2008 – 2017)
 Rafael Valenzuela – lead guitar (1998 – 2008, 2021 – 2022)
 Fred Ocon – bass guitar (2000 – 2003)
 Roberto Guadarrama Jr. – lead guitar, drums (2015 – 2021)

Discography
Studio albums
 1996: Juntos Para Siempre
 1997: Te Llevas Mi Vida
 1998: Ven a Mi Mundo
 1999: Encuentro Con El Milenio
 2000: Sin Mirar Atrás
 2001: Perdón Por Extrañarte
 2002: Comienza A Vivir
 2003: Que Te Vaya Bien En Todo
 2004: Quiero Agradecer
 2008: Para Toda La Vida
 2016: 20 Aniversario

References

Mexican pop music groups
Musical groups from Michoacán